Five-ball (or fiveball, 5-ball, 5 ball and other variant spellings) may refer to:

 5 ball, the pool ball numbered "5" and colored orange
 5 ball, the blue snooker ball, worth 5 points, normally referred to as "the blue"
 5-ball, a five-dimensional -ball in mathematics